In Saudi Arabia, a total of 31 banks are currently licensed by the Saudi Arabian Monetary Authority (SAMA): 11 local banks and 20 branches of foreign banks.

There are 11 local licensed banks in Saudi Arabia:

List of local commercial banks

Foreign banks
There are 20 foreign licensed banks in Saudi Arabia including:

 Bank Muscat
 BNP Paribas
 Credit Suisse (Licensed - had not yet started )
 Deutsche Bank
 Emirates NBD
 First Abu Dhabi Bank (FAB)
 Industrial and Commercial Bank of China (ICBC)
 J.P. Morgan Chase N.A
 MUFG Bank, Ltd.
 National Bank of Bahrain (NBB)
 National Bank of Kuwait (NBK)
 National Bank of Pakistan (NBP)
 Qatar National Bank (QNB)
 Standard Chartered Bank (Licensed - had not yet started )
 State Bank of India (SBI) Bank business stopped upon the bank request of license in 2017
 Trade bank of Iraq (Licensed - had not yet started )
 Ziraat Bankası

The full and updated list can be seen on www.sama.gov.sa.

See also

 List of companies of Saudi Arabia

References

Saudi Arabia
Saudi Arabia
Saudi Arabia
Banks